(19 May 1926 – 27 January 2018) was a Japanese film director and theatre director. He directed films from the 1950s to the 1970s. He died on 27 January 2018 of multiple organ failure at the age of 91.

Career
Sawashima was born in Kotō, Shiga Prefecture, Japan. He joined the Toei Studio in 1950 and worked as an assistant director under Masahiro Makino and Kunio Watanabe before debuting as a director in 1957 with Torawakamaru the Koga Ninja. He is most known for his work in Toei's ninkyo eiga series, but he also directed entertainment jidaigeki featuring Hibari Misora, Chiemi Eri, and Kinnosuke Nakamura. He directed his last film in 1977, and mostly directed stage productions after that. In his final years, he had been attempting to film a version of the Chushingura story, but did not succeed.

He was given a Special Award at the 40th Japan Academy Prize ceremony in 2017 for his career in cinema.

Filmography 
He directed 49 films and wrote nine screenplays:

as director:
 Torawakamaru the Koga Ninja (忍術御前試合 Ninjutsu gozen-jiai) (1957)
 Drunken Sword (1962)
 Jinsei gekijo: hisha kaku (1963)
 Cry of the Mountain (1968)
 Shinsengumi: Assassins of Honor (1969)
 Boruneo taisho: Akamichi ni tokero (1969)
 Akō Rōshi (1979) (TV series) (ep.1,2,12,13,33 and 34)

screenplays:

References

External links 

Tadashi Sawashima at Rotten Tomatoes 

1926 births
2018 deaths
Japanese film directors
Samurai film directors
Japanese theatre directors
People from Shiga Prefecture